Leptomantis fasciatus is a species of frog in the family Rhacophoridae found in Indonesia and Malaysia. Its natural habitats are subtropical or tropical moist lowland forests and intermittent freshwater marshes. It is threatened by habitat loss.

References

fasciatus
Taxonomy articles created by Polbot
Amphibians described in 1895
Taxobox binomials not recognized by IUCN